Zaboliabad (also Romanized as Zābolīābād; also known as Zābolābād) is a village in Fajr Rural District, in the Central District of Gonbad-e Qabus County, Golestan Province, Iran. At the 2006 census, its population was 3,942, in 894 families.

References 

Populated places in Gonbad-e Kavus County